Hwang Hye-young (born July 16, 1966) is a former female badminton player from South Korea.

She won the gold medal in women's doubles together with Chung So-young at the 1992 Summer Olympics in Barcelona. She was also the Gold medallist in the 1988 Olympics in Women's singles category, when Badminton was an exhibition sport in Olympics. She defeated Han Aiping in 3 games 1–11, 11–8, 11–6.

Achievements

Olympic Games

World Championships

World Cup

Asian Games

Asian Championships

Asian Cup

IBF World Grand Prix 
The World Badminton Grand Prix sanctioned by International Badminton Federation (IBF) from 1983 to 2006.

IBF International

Invitational tournament

References

External links
 
 
 

South Korean female badminton players
Badminton players at the 1992 Summer Olympics
Olympic badminton players of South Korea
Olympic gold medalists for South Korea
Olympic medalists in badminton
Asian Games medalists in badminton
1966 births
Living people
Badminton players at the 1986 Asian Games
Badminton players at the 1990 Asian Games
Medalists at the 1992 Summer Olympics
Badminton players at the 1988 Summer Olympics
Asian Games bronze medalists for South Korea
Medalists at the 1986 Asian Games
Medalists at the 1990 Asian Games
Sportspeople from North Chungcheong Province